BharatBenz is a brand of Daimler India Commercial Vehicles (DICV), itself a wholly owned subsidiary of the German manufacturer Daimler Truck AG. The brand is known for its trucks and buses. The headquarters of BharatBenz is at Oragadam, Chennai, India.

The “Bharat” part is symbolic for India.

History

In 2008, Daimler AG planned to enter the Indian market in a joint venture with Hero MotoCorp to build medium and heavy commercial vehicles. A joint venture named Daimler Hero Commercial Vehicles (DHCV) was formed under a Memorandum of Understanding (MOU) in July 2008 with 60% holding of Daimler AG and 40% holding of Hero Group.

Daimler AG and Hero Group announced they  dissolve the Daimler Hero Commercial Vehicles Ltd. joint venture on 15 April 2009 because of an economic downturn in India. Hero group decided to focus on core operation and return the 40% stake in DHCV joint venture to Daimler AG. With 100% stake, Daimler AG renamed DHCV as Daimler India Commercial Vehicles (DICV).

The launch of the BharatBenz brand was announced on 17 February 2011 at Chennai by Daimler AG Chairman Dieter Zetsche and the first BharatBenz truck was unveiled on 4 January 2012 at the Delhi Auto Expo. The decision to launch the brand was prompted by Daimler's determination to compete in the fast-growing Indian truck market against existing Indian brands such as Ashok Leyland, Tata Motors and Indian ventures of other leading global truck manufacturers like VE Commercial Vehicles (Volvo-Eicher Motors-Joint Venture). The entire proposed truck line-up in the 9 to 49-tonne range was unveiled on 2 March 2012.

Early 2014 BharatBenz launched the tractor trailer models and a construction model making itself a full range player in the segment above 9T category spanning across medium and heavy-duty truck segments.

In May 2015, BharatBenz inaugurated its new bus manufacturing facility in Oragadam, Chennai and unveiled its second wave of products – BharatBenz and Mercedes-Benz buses as well as a new range of BharatBenz trucks and BharatBenz heavy-duty tractors.

Bus
A new range of buses is also being launched by the brand “Bharat-Benz”.

Trucks

The BharatBenz heavy-duty trucks are built on the Mercedes-Benz Axor platform, and the medium-duty trucks on the Fuso Canter and Fuso Fighter series. The entire product line meets BSIII standards (comparable to Euro III). All BharatBenz (17 models) trucks are slated to be up to 9% more expensive but be 10% more fuel efficient than the competition.
The Fuso medium and heavy-duty trucks produced in Chennai are also being exported to markets of Africa and Asia, under Daimler's Asia Business Model.
BharatBenz crossed 30,000 units sale mark in January 2016.

From November 2015, Daimler India Commercial Vehicles started delivery of its first set of made-in-india buses. The front engine buses are branded as BharatBenz and are based on the Mitsubishi Fuso Canter platform. These are available in school, staff and tourist variants. The rear engine buses are branded as Mercedes-Benz and are based on the Mercedes-Benz O-500 series. Daimler India Commercial Vehicles have tied-up with Ireland-based organisation WrightBus for bus body building. WrightBus is known for their unique patented aluminique alloy structure, which is lighter and stronger than conventional steel, increasing fuel efficiency and making the buses safer.

Daimler is also exporting these buses under the brand of Mercedes-Benz to African and South-Asian markets.

Trucks

MDT

 1015R (10T GVW Truck, 147 hp)
 1015R+ (10T GVW Truck, 147 hp)
 1215R (12T GVW Truck, 147 hp)
 1215RE (12T GVW Truck, 147 hp)
 1217C (13T GVW Tipper, 167 hp)
 1415R (14.5T GVW Truck, 147hp)
 1415RE (14T GVW Truck, 147 hp)
 1617R (16T GVW Truck, 167 hp)
 1917R (19T GVW Truck, 167 hp)

HDT C

 1923C (19T GVW Tipper, 241 hp)
 2823C (28T GVW Tipper, 241 hp)
 2828C (28T GVW Tipper, 281 hp)
 2828CH (28T GVW Tipper, 281 hp) 
 3528C (35T GVW Tipper, 281 hp) 
 3528CM (35T GVW Tipper, 281 hp)

HDT R

 2823R (28T GVW Truck, 241 hp)
 3523R (35T GVW Truck, 241 hp)
 3528R (35T GVW Truck, 281 hp)

HDT T

 4023T (40T GVW  Tractor Trailer, 241 hp) 
 4028T (40T GVW  Tractor Trailer, 281 hp) 
 5028T (50T GVW Tractor Trailer,  281 hp) 
 5428T (54T GVW Tractor Trailer,  281 hp) 
 5528T (55T GVW Tractor Trailer, 281 hp)

Buses 

 1624 (Bus chassis with OM926 engine, 240 hp power output)
 917 integral (Staff and school bus on 917 chassis with Wrightbus bodywork. 170 hp 4D34i engine)

Production facility
DICV set up a manufacturing plant for the BharatBenz trucks in Oragadam, near Chennai in Tamil Nadu at an investment of over €700 million (44 billion). This is its biggest investment outside Europe. Construction area for plant is 400 acres, out of which 47 acres are dedicated to 3-lane 1.55 kilometer test track. Test track include a bump track, pothole testing and articulation sections,  a water trough, an inspection ramp and a control tower. Initial production capacity at the plant was 36000 units per year for 2012 and was to be expanded to 70,000 units per year by the start of 2013 with an additional investment of 3.5 billion. Series production started in June 2012 with the 2523R truck; sales began in September 2012.

Currently, BharatBenz has over, 3500 employees including both Indian and German staff. Localization rate for BharatBenz truck is 85% with more than 450 local suppliers out of which 41 per cent are based in Tamil Nadu and 44 per cent are in rest of the country, with an aim to exceed 90%.

Daimler has test driven its trucks a distance of 4.5 million km in various conditions at its test track in Oragadam.

Research and development facility
DICV set up a research and development facility at Oragadam manufacturing plant with an initial investment of 12 billion.

Bus manufacturing plant 
On 27 May 2015, DICV inaugurated its new bus manufacturing facility in Oragadam, Chennai. The new state-of-the-art bus manufacturing plant, constructed within the existing premises of DICV spread across an area of 27.91 acres, will manufacture and assemble buses under two brands: Mercedes-Benz and BharatBenz. With an investment of Rs 425 crore, the bus plant is set up for an initial capacity of 1,500 units which can be further expanded to 4,000 units subsequently.

Milestones 
 On 11 August 2016, the 50,000th truck rolled off the line at DICV. DICV reached this milestone just four years after the first vehicle left the line and one year after the 30,000th vehicle was produced.
 In January 2017, the 5000th bus chassis was rolled out of the Daimler Buses India plant. Currently, available bus models from this facility are Mercedes-Benz SHD 2436 (multi axle) – BSIV version, Bharat Benz & Mercedes-Benz 9Ton. In April 2017, a new model of front engine 16ton 230hp (1623) buses was launched in the Indian market (seater and sleeper versions).
 On 12 April 2021 Bharat Benz Heavy duty truck HDT 5228T/5428T was awarded HCV Tractor-head Of The Year by Apollo CV awards.

References

External links 

 
 Daimler India Commercial Vehicles Pvt. Ltd. website

Trucks of India
Companies based in Chennai
Daimler Truck
2011 establishments in Tamil Nadu
Indian companies established in 2011
Vehicle manufacturing companies established in 2011